State Route 359 (SR 359) is a  north-south state highway located entirely in Carter County, Tennessee.

Route description
SR 359 begins at an interchange with I-26/US 19W/US 23 exit 27. SR 359 turns east on to Milligan Highway and continues a northeasterly track until it ends at an intersection with US 321/SR 67.

History

Prior to 1982, SR 359 was designated SR 67A.

Major intersections

See also

References

Transportation in Carter County, Tennessee
359
Johnson City, Tennessee
Elizabethton, Tennessee